Kaszuby may refer to:
Kashubia, a region in northern Poland, Kaszëbë in Kashubian, Kaszuby in Polish
Kaszuby, Lublin Voivodeship, East Poland
Kaszuby, Ontario, Canada